The 1987 season was the New York Giants' 63rd in the National Football League (NFL) and their fifth under head coach Bill Parcells. The Giants entered the season as the defending Super Bowl champion but failed to qualify for the playoffs. They were the sixth team in NFL history to enter a season as the defending Super Bowl champion and miss the playoffs. The Giants started the season 0–5, becoming the first defending Super Bowl champion to lose their first 5 games. Ultimately, the Giants never recovered from their 0–5 start and failed to improve on their 14–2 record from 1986 and finished at 6–9. They were eliminated from playoff contention for the first time since 1983. They also placed last in their division for the first time since that same season.

Offseason

NFL draft

Personnel

Staff

NFL replacement players 
After the league decided to use replacement players during the NFLPA strike, the following team was assembled:

Roster

Regular season

Schedule

Game summaries

Week 1

Week 2

Week 3

Week 4

Week 5

Week 6

Week 7

Week 8

Week 9

Week 10

Week 11

Week 12

Week 13

Week 14

Week 15

Standings

Awards and honors 
 Lawrence Taylor, NFC Pro Bowl selection
 Lawrence Taylor, Pro Football Weekly: 1st team all-conf.
 Lawrence Taylor, UPI: 2nd team all-conf.
 Lawrence Taylor, Associated Press: 2nd team all-NFL
 Lawrence Taylor, Pro Football Weekly: 1st team all-NFL

References

External links 
 1987 New York Giants at Pro-Football-Reference.com

New York Giants seasons
New York Giants
New York Giants season
20th century in East Rutherford, New Jersey
Meadowlands Sports Complex